Christian Ludwig Gerling (10 July 1788 – 15 January 1864) studied under Carl Friedrich Gauss, obtaining his doctorate in 1812 for a thesis entitled: Methodi proiectionis orthographicae usum ad calculos parallacticos facilitandos explicavit simulque eclipsin solarem die, at the University of Göttingen. He is notable for his work on geodetics and in 1927 some 60 letters of correspondence between Gerling and Gauss on the topic were published. He is also notable as the doctoral advisor of Julius Plücker.

Gerling, whose father was also called Christian Ludwig Gerling and was a pastor at the St. Jacobi church, was born in Hamburg and attended the Johanneum. In 1817, he became professor of mathematics at the University of Marburg.

References
Schaeffer C, ed. Briefwechsel zwischen Carl Friedrich Gauss und Christian Ludwig Gerling. Berlin, Otto Elsner; 1927 (reviewed DE Smith (1928) Bulletin of the American Mathematical Society 34: 665–666)

External links 
Gerling's 12-Piece Dissection of an Irregular Tetrahedron into Its Mirror Image

19th-century German mathematicians
19th-century German astronomers
19th-century German physicists
Scientists from Hamburg
University of Göttingen alumni
Academic staff of the University of Marburg
1788 births
1864 deaths